Reginald Brian was a medieval Bishop of St David's and Bishop of Worcester. He was the son of Guy Bryan, 1st Baron Bryan, brother of Guy Brian the younger, and brother-in-law of Alice Brian, better known as Alice de Bryene.

Brian was consecrated Bishop of St David's on 26 September 1350 and translated to the see of Worcester on 22 October 1352.

Brian died on 10 December 1361.

Citations

References

 

Bishops of Worcester
Bishops of St Davids
14th-century English Roman Catholic bishops
1361 deaths
Year of birth unknown